Phyllisciella is a genus of fungi within the family Lichinaceae. The genus is monotypic, containing only the species Phyllisciella marionensis.

References

External links
Phyllisciella at Index Fungorum

Lichinomycetes
Lichen genera
Taxa described in 1974
Monotypic Ascomycota genera